William Edward Miller (January 3, 1957 – January 3, 2019) was a running back in the Canadian Football League.

Miller played his college football at Ouachita Baptist University from 1975 to 1978, where he rushed for 3813 career yards and was inducted into their Athletics Hall of Fame in 2003.

He joined the CFL's Winnipeg Blue Bombers in 1980, rushing for 1053 yards. He was named an all star and won the CFL's Most Outstanding Rookie Award. He rushed for 684 yard in 1981 and 1076 yards in 1982, being named an all star in 1982. He played three seasons total with Winnipeg and totaled 21 touchdowns.

He moved to the United States Football League in 1984 with the Pittsburgh Maulers. After playing 1985 with the Orlando Renegades, he returned to the CFL for one last season, playing 5 games with the Toronto Argonauts in 1986. Miller died on his 62nd birthday, January 3, 2019, from cancer.

References

1957 births
2019 deaths
People from Rison, Arkansas
Players of American football from Arkansas
Winnipeg Blue Bombers players
Toronto Argonauts players
Canadian football running backs
Pittsburgh Maulers players
Washington Federals/Orlando Renegades players
Canadian Football League Rookie of the Year Award winners
Ouachita Baptist Tigers football players
Deaths from cancer in Arkansas